The Nelly Sachs Prize (German: Nelly Sachs Preis) is a literary prize given every two years by the German city of Dortmund.  Named after the Jewish poet and Nobel laureate Nelly Sachs, the prize includes a cash award of €15,000.  It honours authors for outstanding literary contributions to the promotion of understanding between peoples.

Because there were not enough funds to honour an awardee in 2009, the prize was awarded in 2010. This was the first time that a year was skipped in the biennial schedule.

In 2019, the judges for the 2019 award reversed their decision to give the prize to Kamila Shamsie, after the German website Ruhrbarone pointed out her long-standing public support for the BDS movement. The Dortmund City Council, the hosts of the award stated "Shamsie's political positioning to actively participate in the cultural boycott as part of the BDS (Boycott Disinvestment Sanctions) campaign against the Israeli government is clearly in contradiction to the statutory objectives of the award and the spirit of the Nelly Sachs Prize,".

In response to the withdrawal, Shamsie said "In the just-concluded Israeli elections, Benjamin Netanyahu announced plans to annex up to one third of the West Bank, in contravention of international law and his political opponent Benny Gantz's objection to this was that Netanyahu had stolen his idea; this closely followed the killing of two Palestinian teenagers by Israeli forces – which was condemned as 'appalling' by the UN special coordinator for the Middle East peace process. In this political context, the jury has chosen to withdraw the award from me on the basis of my support for a non-violent campaign to bring pressure on the Israeli government."

Awardees

References

External links 
 

Awards established in 1961
German literary awards
International literary awards
Dortmund